Bovine respiratory syncytial virus (BRSV) is pneumovirus closely related to human respiratory syncytial virus (RSV) that is a common cause of respiratory disease in cattle, particularly calves. It is a negative-sense, single-stranded RNA virus that replicates in the cytoplasm of the cell. Similarly to other single-stranded RNA viruses, the genome of BRSV has a high mutation rate, which results in great antigenetic variation. Thus, BRSV can be split into four different subgroups based on antigen expression (A, B, AB, and intermediate).

Causes 
In around 90% of cases, infection with BRSV results in secondary bacterial pneumonia due to interference with the host's immune system and enhancement of bacterial adherence and colonisation by the virus. Pasteurella multocida, a common commensal of the nasopharynx of cattle, appears to be the main bacterial agent in BRSV-related bovine respiratory disease (BRD).

Treatment 
Similarly to other viral infections, treatment of BRSV is typically supportive. Anti-inflammatory drugs may be required to reduce fever and inflammation, which may increase the affected animal's food and water intake. Non-steroidal anti-inflammatory drugs (NSAIDs) are preferred to corticosteroids due to the latter's immunosuppressive effects. In the case of a secondary bacterial infection, antimicrobials may be given. In contrast to human RSV, commercial BRSV vaccines are available. However, appropriate biosecurity measures and animal husbandry may be sufficient to prevent spread of disease.

References 

Bovine diseases
Animal viral diseases
Pneumoviridae